Villosa fabalis, the rayed bean, is a species of freshwater mussel, an aquatic bivalve mollusk in the family Unionidae, the river mussels.

Distribution and conservation status 

This species lives in eastern North America. It is native to the drainages of the Ohio River, the Tennessee River, and the Great Lakes.

The Canadian Species at Risk Act listed it in the List of Wildlife Species at Risk as being endangered in Canada.

References

fabalis